Buckingham is an outback locality in the Shire of Boulia, Queensland, Australia.

Geography 
Buckingham is in the Channel Country. Wills Creek and Makbut Creek pass through the north-east of the locality from the north (Dajarra) to the east (Warenda). All watercourses in this area are part of the Lake Eyre drainage basin, and most will dry up before their water reaches Lake Eyre.

The Boulia Mount Isa Highway passes through the locality from the north (Dajarra) to the south (Georgina).

The predominant land use is grazing on native vegetation.

Education 
There are no schools in Buckingham. The nearest primary schools are in Dajarra and Boulia. The nearest secondary schools are located in Mount Isa and Winton and are both too far for a daily commute. The Spinifex State College in Mount Isa offers boarding facilities. Other boarding schools or distance education would be options.

References 

Shire of Boulia
Localities in Queensland